"Candy" is the fifth and final single from LL Cool J's seventh album, Phenomenon. It was released on July 3, 1998 for Def Jam Recordings and featured production from the Trackmasters, who were then known as Poke & Tone. The song spent two weeks on the Billboard Hot R&B/Hip-Hop Airplay chart, peaking at No. 62. New Edition members, Ralph Tresvant and Ricky Bell contributed vocals to the song.

Track listing

A-Side
"Candy" (Radio Edit)

The sample is based on Alexander O' Neal's Sunshine.

B-Side
"Candy" (LP Version) 
"Candy" (Instrumental)

References

1997 songs
1998 singles
LL Cool J songs
Def Jam Recordings singles
Song recordings produced by Trackmasters
Songs written by Samuel Barnes (songwriter)
Songs written by Michael Jonzun
Songs written by LL Cool J
Songs written by Jimmy Jam and Terry Lewis
Songs written by Maurice Starr